Who Am I 2015 (also known as Jackie Chan Presents: Amnesia) is a 2015 Chinese action comedy film directed by Song Yinxi. This is the remake of Chan's film Who Am I? (1998). It was released in China on June 12, 2015.

Cast
Wang Haixiang as Li Ziwei
Yao Xingtong as Tong Xin
Zhang Lanxin as Jiao
Yu Rongguang as Uncle Nan 
Ken Lo as Biao
Yang Zheng
Tony Ho

Reception
By June 13, the film had earned  at the Chinese box office.

References

External links
 

Chinese action comedy films
2015 action comedy films